The Dark Tower, first published in 2007, is a series of comic books (originally published by Marvel Comics and later republished by Gallery 13) based on Stephen King's The Dark Tower series of novels. Overall, it is plotted by Robin Furth and scripted by Peter David. Stephen King serves as Creative and Executive Director of the project.

Overview

The Dark Tower: Beginnings
The first chapter run of the series, originally entitled simply The Dark Tower, launched February 7, 2007, and consisted of 30 issues that made up five volumes illustrated primarily by Jae Lee and Richard Isanove. The first volume, The Gunslinger Born, was based mostly on flashbacks from The Dark Tower: The Gunslinger and The Dark Tower IV: Wizard and Glass; the remaining volumes (The Long Road Home, Treachery, Fall of Gilead, and Battle of Jericho Hill) contained mostly new/original content which expanded upon details and events more briefly referenced throughout the novels. In addition to the five primary story arcs, the chapter run also included the one-shot, The Sorcerer.  As stated by Peter David's afterword to The Long Road Home, the chapter run detailed Roland Deschain's "progress from callow youth to gunslinger," starting with his adventures in Mejis from Wizard and Glass and ending with the Battle of Jericho Hill (as detailed in The Dark Tower V: Wolves of the Calla and The Dark Tower VII: The Dark Tower).  This series was re-titled The Dark Tower: Beginnings to clarify its prequel status when Gallery 13 took over as publisher.

The Dark Tower: The Gunslinger
The second chapter run, under the title of The Dark Tower: The Gunslinger, began May 9, 2010. It consisted of another 30 issues across five additional volumes written by Furth and David. Following Lee's departure from the series, this chapter run featured Isanove teaming with a different artist for each story arc. The first volume, The Journey Begins, took place 12 years after the Battle of Jericho Hill and mostly detailed events which occurred between the time of the battle and the start of the novel The Gunslinger. The second volume, The Little Sisters of Eluria, was based mostly upon the short story of the same name.  The remaining volumes were largely adaptations of the novellas within The Gunslinger.  The third, The Battle of Tull, was based mostly upon content from "The Gunslinger".  The fourth, The Way Station, was based mostly upon "The Way Station" and "The Oracle and the Mountains".  The fifth, The Man in Black, was based mostly upon "The Slow Mutants" and "The Gunslinger and the Dark Man".  In addition to the five primary story arcs, two limited series (Sheemie's Tale and Evil Ground) and another one-shot (So Fell Lord Perth) were released as part of this chapter run.

The Dark Tower: The Drawing of the Three
The Dark Tower comics were planned to be finished after the August 7, 2013, release of So Fell Lord Perth. However, on April 25, 2014, a third chapter run, The Dark Tower: The Drawing of the Three, was announced. This chapter run, based primarily on the novel The Dark Tower II: The Drawing of the Three, began September 17, 2014. The series continued to be written by Furth and David but featured, for the first time, new, rotating artistic teams that did not feature Isanove.  The volumes in this chapter run focused on the newly gathered (or 'drawn') members of Roland's ka-tet, as divided in the novel into sections based on the mysterious doors through which Roland must travel.  The first and second volumes (The Prisoner and House of Cards) focused on Eddie Dean, who was introduced in the section of the novel also named "The Prisoner".  The third and fourth volumes (Lady of Shadows and Bitter Medicine) focused on Odetta Holmes, who was introduced in the section of the novel named "The Lady of Shadows". The fifth volume (The Sailor) focused on Jake Chambers, who survived his original fate thanks to a change in the timeline (as shown in the section of the novel named "The Pusher") and resultantly struggled to find a way to return to Mid-World (as depicted in the first half of The Dark Tower III: The Waste Lands).  This chapter run was the last to be published by Marvel Comics.

Collected editions and end of Marvel publication
On November 7, 2007, Marvel began publishing collections for each story arc, and on September 21, 2011, it began publishing hardcover omnibus editions collecting each chapter run, with bonus materials not contained in the original releases.  However, only the first two chapter runs received the omnibus treatment; Marvel's publication of the series ended before an omnibus edition of The Dark Tower: The Drawing of the Three was released.

Gallery 13 republication
In 2018, Gallery 13 took over publication of the Dark Tower comics, beginning in August by republishing the collected graphic novels from the original chapter run of the series (rebranded as Stephen King's The Dark Tower: Beginnings), with the collected graphic novels from The Dark Tower: The Gunslinger chapter run set to be republished beginning spring 2019. Since the announcement of the rights acquisition specifically indicated only the first 11 volumes, there is currently neither any information whether the republication ultimately will include The Dark Tower: The Drawing of the Three nor any information whether any new content will be produced.

List of original Marvel Comics chapter runs and story arcs

Notes
 Cover artists listed are for primary first-printing cover art, not additional printings and/or variant covers.

List of original Marvel Comics companion releases

List of original Marvel Comics collected editions

Story arc collections

Notes
 Story arc collections 1-10 originally were made available in both hardcover and softcover (paperback) formats.  Beginning with collection 11, the only printed edition released was a paperback format (this did not apply to the omnibus editions, which continued to be released solely in hardcover).

Omnibus collections

List of Gallery 13 republished collected editions

Story arc collections

Boxed set collections

Omnibus collections

See also
The Stand (comics)

References

External links
Official Dark Tower comics site

 
Dark Tower, The